USS Nymph was a steamer acquired by the Union Navy during the American Civil War. She was used by the Union Navy as a dispatch boat in support of the Union Navy blockade of Confederate waterways.

Cricket No. 3 commissioned as Nymph
Cricket No. 3, a stern wheel wooden river steamer built at Cincinnati, Ohio, in 1863, was purchased by the Navy at Cincinnati 8 March 1864, fitted out as a "tinclad" gunboat, and commissioned at Mound City, Illinois, as Nymph 11 April 1864, Acting Master Patrick Donnelly in command.

Assigned to the Mississippi Squadron
 
Nymph patrolled the Mississippi River and its tributaries through the end of the Civil War, helping to maintain Union lines of supply and communication.

Post-war decommissioning and sale
She decommissioned 2½ miles above Cairo, Illinois, 28 June 1865 and was sold at public auction at Mound City 17 August 1865 to M. A. Hutchinson.

See also

Anaconda Plan
Mississippi Squadron

References

External links
 Photo gallery at Naval Historical Center

Ships of the Union Navy
Ships built in Cincinnati
Steamships of the United States Navy
Gunboats of the United States Navy
Dispatch boats of the United States Navy
American Civil War auxiliary ships of the United States
American Civil War patrol vessels of the United States
1863 ships